This article contains information about the literary events and publications of 1641.

Events
March 12 – Abraham Cowley's play The Guardian is acted at Trinity College, Cambridge, in the presence of Prince Charles (later King Charles II).
Spring – Pierre Corneille marries Marie de Lampérière.
c. May – William Davenant is convicted of high treason for his part in the First Army Plot in England.
August 5 – Because of an increase in cases of plague, John Lowin delivers warrants to London theatres ordering them to close.
c. December – Edward Hyde, 1st Earl of Clarendon, becomes an advisor to King Charles I of England.

New books

Prose
George Abbot – Vindiciae Sabbathi
Moses Amyraut – De l'elevation de la foy et de l'abaissement de la raison en la creance des mysteres de la religion
Richard Baker – Apologie for Laymen's Writing in Divinity, with a Short Meditation upon the Fall of Lucifer
Sir Edward Coke – The Complete Copyholder
Luís Vélez de Guevara – 
William Habington – Observations upon History
Joseph Hall – Episcopacy by Divine Right
Samuel Hartlib (nominal author, really by Gabriel Plattes) – A Description of the Famous Kingdom of Macaria
Thomas Heywood – The Life of Merlin surnamed Ambrosius
Thomas Hobbes – De Cive
Sir Francis Kynaston – Leoline and Sydanis
John Milton – Of Reformation
Sir Robert Naunton (died 1635) – Fragmenta Regalia, or Observations on the late Queen Elizabeth, her Times and Favourites
Mother Shipton (died 1561, attributed) – The prophesie of Mother Shipton in the raigne of King Henry the eighth
Sir Henry Spelman – De Sepultura
Heinrich Stahl – Leyen Spiegel
John Taylor – John Taylors Last Voyage and Adventure
Nicolaes Tulp – Observationes Medicae
John Wilkins – Mercury, or The Secret and Swift Messenger
Francisco de Quevedo – Providencia de Dios
Juan Eusebio Nieremberg – De la hermosura de Dios y su amabilidad, por las infinitas perfecciones del ser divino
Luis Vélez de Guevara – El diablo Cojuelo

Drama
Richard Braithwaite – Mercurius Britanicus
Richard Brome – A Jovial Crew
Abraham Cowley – The Guardian
John Day – The Parliament of Bees (published)
John Denham – The Sophy
Thomas Killigrew – The Prisoners and Claricilla (published)
Shackerley Marmion – The Antiquary (published)
James Shirley – The Cardinal
John Tatham – The Distracted State
Lope de Vega (died 1635) – El caballero de Olmedo (posthumous, written in 1620)
Jan Vos – Aran en Titus, of wraak en weerwraak (Aran and Titus, or Revenge and Vengeance)

Births
April 8 (baptised) – William Wycherley, English playwright (died 1716)
April 15 – Robert Sibbald, Scottish historian (died 1722)
March 15 (baptised) – Laurence Hyde, 1st Earl of Rochester, English politician and writer (died 1711)
May 16 – Dudley North, English economist, merchant and politician (died 1691)
May – Juan Núñez de la Peña, Spanish historian (died 1721)
Late October – Henry Dodwell, Irish-born theologian (died 1711)
unknown dates
Pierre Allix, French Protestant author (died 1717)
William Sherlock, English theologian (died 1707)

Deaths
January 11
Franciscus Gomarus, Dutch theologian (born 1563)
Juan de Jáuregui, Spanish poet and painter (born 1583)
February 15 – Sara Copia Sullam, Italian poet and writer (born 1592)
April 6 (buried) – Thomas Nabbes, English dramatist (born 1605)
April 13 – Richard Montagu, English theologian (born 1577)
June 26 – Antony Hickey, Irish Franciscan theologian (born 1586)
July 15 – Arthur Johnston, Scottish poet and physician (born c. 1579)
August 9 – Augustine Baker, Welsh-born Benedictine writer (born 1575)
August 16 – Thomas Heywood, English playwright, actor, poet and author (born c. 1573)
August (between 14 and 27) – Sir William Vaughan, Welsh writer and colonist (born 1575)

References

 
Years of the 17th century in literature